Elections were held in the Australian state of Queensland on 3 August 1957 to elect the 75 members of the state's Legislative Assembly. The major parties contesting the election were the Queensland Labor Party led by Premier Vince Gair, the Labor Party led by former Deputy Premier Jack Duggan, and the Country-Liberal coalition led by Frank Nicklin.

The elections, only 15 months into the parliamentary term, were made necessary by the collapse of the nine-term Labor government. Gair had formed the Queensland Labor Party after being expelled from the Labor Party, and attempted to stay in power as a minority government.  However, a request for supply was denied on 12 June, forcing the election.  The Country-Liberal Coalition won a decisive victory, taking 42 seats against only 31 for the two Labor factions combined.

Key dates

Background
On 18 April 1957, the Queensland Central Executive of the Labor Party passed a vote of no confidence in Premier Gair, and on 24 April, despite having gained a unanimous vote of support from the Cabinet, he was expelled from the Labor Party. On 26 April, Gair and 25 MLAs met and formed the Queensland Labor Party (QLP) with those present, with Gair as leader. Those at the meeting included all of the Cabinet except Deputy Premier Jack Duggan and two ex-Labor Independents.  All these were also expelled from the party. Duggan resigned from the ministry on 29 April and succeeded Gair as leader of the Labor Party, which commanded the support of 22 MLAs.

Gair almost immediately began talks with Nicklin for confidence and supply support in the legislature.  However, Nicklin broke them off on the advice of federal Country Party leader Arthur Fadden, who believed the ructions in Labor gave Nicklin a chance to become Premier himself, ending 22 years in opposition.  On 12 June 1957, Lieutenant Governor and Chief Justice of Queensland Alan Mansfield (Governor John Lavarack was indisposed) ordered Parliament to reassemble.  Shortly after 10:30 pm that night, Treasurer Ted Walsh moved that supply be granted to the Gair QLP government.  The motion was defeated after the ALP and Coalition rose to vote against it, bringing the Gair government down.  Gair immediately asked for new elections, which were called for 3 August.

Campaign
On 1 July, Frank Nicklin delivered the Country Party's policy speech at Maroochydore, while Kenneth Morris delivered the Liberal Party's policy speech in Brisbane. The two coalition partners declared to the electorate that only they could deliver unity and effective government, an acceleration of development and civil rights, as well as court supervision of union ballots to limit strike action.

On 4 July, Jack Duggan, the Labor leader, announced Labor's campaign slogan, "A fair go for all", and promised three weeks' annual leave (the issue over which Premier Vince Gair and the party executive had split) would be implemented if his party was elected. On 8 July, Gair, the incumbent Premier representing the Queensland Labor Party (QLP), spent half his speech talking about the dispute that had led to the split, promised an attack upon Communism and a continuance of the previous government's development platform.

Nominations closed on 12 July, with a record total of 219 candidates. Four seats were uncontested, but many seats had both Labor and QLP contestants. Some contests became particularly bitter as the Labor Party accused their QLP opponents of sectarianism and alleged direct interference by ministers of the Catholic Church, despite Archbishop James Duhig's refusal to get involved. The campaigns were strongest in the leaders' and deputy leaders' own seats.

Politicians from around Australia, in particular from the Labor Party, came to Queensland during the campaign, including the federal opposition leader, Dr H. V. Evatt, Arthur Calwell, Clyde Cameron and former Victorian premier John Cain, who died of a stroke on 9 August after giving a speech in Townsville.

Results

When the writs were dropped, the Labor forces were in a precarious position.  Every ALP MP faced a QLP challenger, and every QLP MP faced an ALP challenger.  This created dozens of three-cornered contests, and the first-past-the-post system left them without the option of directing preferences to each other even if they wanted to do so.

The Coalition actually suffered a swing of 1.2 percent against it.  However, the ructions in Labor allowed the Coalition to win a number of three-cornered contests, assuring a comfortable majority for Nicklin, with 42 seats against only 31 for the two Labor factions combined. The ALP lost both Duggan and deputy leader Felix Dittmer, whose seats were won by Liberal candidates. The QLP lost 14 seats (two of them to the ALP), but seven of the ten ministers retained their seats.  This began what would be 32 years of non-Labor government in Queensland.

|}

 791,719 electors were enrolled to vote at the election, but three Country seats representing 30,956 enrolled voters and one Liberal seat representing 13,308 voters were unopposed.

Seats changing party representation

This table lists changes in party representation at the 1957 election.

Party changes before election

The following seats changed party representation before the election due to the split of the ALP.

Seats changing hands at election

 Members in **italics** did not recontest their seats.
 All sitting members of the Queensland Labor Party were elected at the previous election as ALP candidates.
 Sitting member for Gregory, George Devries died before election day. As a result, a supplementary election was held in October for the seat.

Aftermath
The Country Party's win in this election proved to be one of the major turning points in Queensland politics; they remained in power continuously until the 1989 state election.

The ALP elected Les Wood as party leader and Eric Lloyd as deputy leader; neither had previously served in a ministry. Wood, the member for North Toowoomba, died in office on 29 March 1958, and Duggan returned as both a member of Parliament and leader of the party at the by-election on 31 May. Dittmer, meanwhile, was elected to the Australian Senate.

Former Prime Minister Frank Forde, who lost his seat of Flinders by one vote, alleged the wrongful disallowance of some votes and successfully lodged a petition against his opponent's return at the Court of Disputed Returns; however he lost the resulting by-election.

See also
 Members of the Queensland Legislative Assembly, 1956–1957
 Members of the Queensland Legislative Assembly, 1957–1960
 Candidates of the Queensland state election, 1957
 Gair Ministry
 Nicklin Ministry

References

Elections in Queensland
1957 elections in Australia
1950s in Queensland
August 1957 events in Australia